Welling is a hamlet in southern Alberta, Canada within Cardston County.

Demographics 
The population of Welling according to the 2008 municipal census conducted by Cardston County is 30.

See also 
List of communities in Alberta
List of hamlets in Alberta

References 

Cardston County
Latter-day Saint settlements in Canada
Hamlets in Alberta